Louis Leterrier (born 17 June 1973) is a French film director and producer. Best known for his work in action films, he directed the first two Transporter films (2002–2013), Unleashed (2005), The Incredible Hulk (2008), Clash of the Titans (2010), Now You See Me (2013) and the streaming television series The Dark Crystal: Age of Resistance (2019). His latest film will be the tenth Fast & Furious installment, Fast X (2023).

Early life
Leterrier was born in Paris, the son of director François Leterrier and costume designer Catherine Leterrier (née Fabius). He is the nephew of politician Laurent Fabius and antiquarian François Fabius. He was guided artistically by his mother. Leterrier was at first a drummer for a music group before experimenting with short films. At the age of 18, after some training in advertising and publicity, he left France to study cinema at the Tisch School of the Arts at New York University.

Career
In 1997, he assisted Jean-Pierre Jeunet on the set of Alien Resurrection. On returning to France, he worked with Luc Besson on the production of commercials for Club Internet and L'Oréal as well as on the film Joan of Arc. He also collaborated, as the second assistant director, with Alain Chabat on the production of Astérix & Obélix: Mission Cléopâtre (2002).

Later in 2002, Louis Leterrier directed The Transporter, an action movie starring Jason Statham. Although the US release lists him as artistic director and Corey Yuen as director, the opening credits of the European release grant him directorial credit and list Yuen as action director. Leterrier later entered the so-called "Besson stable" – a group of directors working on films produced by or associated with Luc Besson – alongside Chris Nahon and Pierre Morel. He directed Jet Li in Unleashed, his solo debut feature, a full-length martial arts film (2004). Luc Besson then entrusted him with directorial control of Transporter 2, set this time in Miami.

In 2008, as part of a wave of French directors employed in Hollywood, he directed his first big-budget American film, The Incredible Hulk. His next project, a remake of the 1981 Clash of the Titans produced by Warner Bros., was released on 2 April 2010. Leterrier had mentioned that he would like to create a Clash of the Titans franchise, should the latest film prove to be successful. However, in June 2010, Jonathan Liebesman was named as director of the sequel, leaving Leterrier's involvement in future films in doubt.

Leterrier directed the spy comedy film Grimsby (2016), written by, and starring, Sacha Baron Cohen. In March 2015, Deadline Hollywood reported that Leterrier was in talks to direct the shark thriller film In the Deep, for Sony Pictures Entertainment. However, on 3 June 2015, TheWrap reported that Leterrier had exited the film due to creative differences and the reduction of the previously told budget.

In 2019, Leterrier directed the first season of The Dark Crystal: Age of Resistance for Netflix, a prequel series to The Dark Crystal consisting of ten hour-long episodes, consisting entirely of puppetry and special effects.

In 2022, Leterrier announced that he will be directing Fast X, the tenth installment of the Fast & Furious franchise, replacing series director Justin Lin, which is produced by and starring Vin Diesel.

Filmography

Feature films
Director

Executive producer
 Wrath of the Titans (2012)
 Now You See Me 2 (2016)

Producer
 Strays (2023)

Acting roles

Television

Other credits

References

External links
 

1973 births
Living people
Action film directors
Tisch School of the Arts alumni
Film directors from Paris
French film producers
French people of Jewish descent
Primetime Emmy Award winners